Halimah al-Sa'diyah, was the foster-mother of the Islamic prophet  Muhammad. Halimah and her husband were from the tribe of Sa'd b. Bakr, a subdivision of Hawazin (a large North Arabian tribe or group of tribes).

Relationship with Muhammad
Aminah bint Wahb, the mother of Muhammad, was waiting for the arrival of the Banu Sa'd; the women within the tribe of the Banu Sa'd were foster mothers. They would take the children of Mecca to the desert and teach them classical Arabic and other skills; in return, they would receive a salary from the family of the child in Mecca. Halimah's husband was al-Harith bin Abdul Uzza. Her son was named Abdullah, while the daughters were named Unaysa and Hudhafa. While traveling to Mecca, she was unable to feed her child because her she-camel stopped lactating. In Mecca, all those looking for foster children rejected taking care of the orphan Muhammad because they feared not getting paid on account of his father being dead. Halimah felt sad that every woman in her tribe had received a child except her. So she told her husband al-Harith: "By God, I do not like the idea of returning with my friends without a child; I will go and take that orphan." Her husband agreed. Immediately after accepting him, blessing came to her and her family. Her husband's flock during a time of great famine was healthy and producing milk while the rest of the people's flocks were dying. 

When he was two years old, Halimah took him to Aminah and insisted that she let him remain with her, to which she relented. A strange and mysterious event happened a few months later. Muhammad's foster brother was playing alone (as the prophet was not like other kids and did not play much), then suddenly Halimah and her husband saw their son (Muhammad's foster brother) who came running back and shouted: "two men dressed in white grabbed my brother and cut his chest." So then Halimah and Al-Harith ran to Muhammad and found him pale-faced. When they asked him what happened, he said: "Two men came and opened my chest and took a portion of it". After this event, she gave up fostering him and informed his mother about what had happened.

She later accepted Islam after the Battle of Hunayn.

Death
She died in 9 A.H. and her grave lies in Jannatul Baqi, Medina. The remains of the place she used to live in and where Muhammad grew up still stand today.

Family tree

 * indicates that the marriage order is disputed
 Note that direct lineage is marked in bold.

See also
 Sahaba
 Aminah bint Wahab

References

External links
 
 http://www.gulfson.com/vb/f136/t13052/

Women companions of the Prophet
7th-century women
Hawazin
Year of birth unknown
Year of death missing
Wet nurses
Burials at Jannat al-Baqī